Archiv für Geschichte der Philosophie (English: Archive for the History of Philosophy) is a peer-reviewed academic journal of philosophy, publishing in German, English, French, and Italian. It focuses on the history of philosophy.

See also 
 List of philosophy journals

External links 
 

History of philosophy journals
Publications established in 1888
Multilingual journals
De Gruyter academic journals
Quarterly journals